Ozeriany is a village in Ivano-Frankivsk Raion of Ivano-Frankivsk Oblast, Ukraine. It belongs to Burshtyn urban hromada, one of the hromadas of Ukraine.

History
Ozeriany was mentioned on 9 November 1444, in the books of the Galician court.

In 1939, the village had 610 inhabitants (590 Ukrainians, 10 Latins, 10 Jews).

Until 18 July 2020, Ozeriany belonged to Halych Raion. The raion was abolished in July 2020 as part of the administrative reform of Ukraine, which reduced the number of raions of Ivano-Frankivsk Oblast to six. The area of Halych Raion was merged into Ivano-Frankivsk Raion.

References

Villages in Ivano-Frankivsk Raion